Lauriston Airport  is an airport located west of Hillsborough, the main town on the island of Carriacou in Grenada. It is also known as Carriacou Island Airport.

Facilities
It has one runway which measures .

Airlines and destinations

References

Airports in Grenada
Carriacou and Petite Martinique